Faythe Levine (born 1977, Minneapolis, Minnesota) is a photographer, director, author, artist, and prominent figure in the D.I.Y. Ethic indie craft movement. Her diverse body of work is centered on community, empowerment and documentation. She grew up in the suburbs of Seattle then spent a number of years in the Midwest, moved to rural Middle Tennessee and now resides in Sheboygan, WI.

In 2002 she founded and co-curated Flying Fish Gallery with filmmaker, and musician Brent Goodsell. Flying Fish closed in 2003. From 2003 through 2009 Levine designed, made and sold a small line of handmade goods under the moniker Flying Fish Design. In 2004 she founded a popular Midwest craft fair called Art vs. Craft that was successful for its 10 years until Levine moved from Milwaukee. Art vs. Craft and Flying Fish Design led to her producing and directing a documentary called Handmade Nation: The Rise of D.I.Y. Art, Craft, and Design, independently released in 2009.  A companion book with the same title was released in 2008 published by Princeton Architectural Press. In 2005, she opened Paper Boat Boutique & Gallery in Milwaukee, Wisconsin with business partner Kimberly Kisiolek where she curated the gallery until Paper Boat closed in 2009. She played the musical saw for the band Wooden Robot from 2002-2006. Wooden Robot is the soundtrack music on Handmade Nation. In 2013 Levine and her co-director/author Sam Macon began production on her second documentary Sign Painters about the trade and tradition of hand painted lettering in America, released in 2013. A companion book under the same title was released in October 2012 published by Princeton Architectural Press. From 2010-2013 Levine was the curator at Sky High Gallery in Milwaukee, WI. In 2013 Levine was selected as one of seven mid-career artists chosen to show work in the two year traveling exhibition Alien She, the first retrospective on Riot Grrrl and its influence. While living in rural Tennessee she met and became friends with activist Merril Mushroom and collaborated on releasing Mushroom's one-act play written in the 1980s Bar Dykes about lesbian bar culture in the 1950s. Bar Dykes was designed and published by Pegacorn Press, now in its fourth edition. Since 2017 Levine has been working at the John Micheal Kohler Arts Center in Sheboygan, WI., and is currently the Program Director for Arts/Industry residency hosted at Kohler Co. and curates related exhibitions at the Arts Center.

Her father, Rick Merlin Levine, is an astrologer and daily horoscope author for over 20 years. He is also the co-founder of Kepler College. Levine's mother, Suzanne Wechsler, is an organic farmer and artisan cheese maker in Washington State. Her farm is called Samish Bay Cheese.

Bibliography
 Bar Dykes (2015), Pegacorn Press 
 Sign Painters (2012), Princeton Architectural Press, 
 Handmade Nation: The Rise of D.I.Y Art, Craft and Design (2008), Princeton Architectural Press,

External links
 Faythe's website
 Levine's impact on Milwaukee's cultural landscape is unequaled
 Sign Painter official site
 New York Times article
 Milwaukee Journal Sentinel article

1977 births
Living people
American photographers
Filmmakers from Milwaukee
American women photographers
21st-century American women